Cocculina leptoglypta is a species of sea snail, deep-sea limpet, a marine gastropod mollusk in the family Cocculinidae.

Description

Distribution
European waters

References

External links

Cocculinidae
Gastropods described in 1897